Peter Valentinovich Turchin (born 1957) is a Russian-American complexity scientist, specializing in an area of study he and his colleagues developed called cliodynamics—mathematical modeling and statistical analysis of the dynamics of historical societies. He is currently Editor-in-Chief at Cliodynamics: The Journal of Quantitative History and Cultural Evolution. , he is a director of the Evolution Institute.

Early life and education 
Peter Turchin was born in 1957 in Obninsk, Russia, and in 1964 he moved with his family to Moscow. In 1975 he enrolled at Moscow State University's Faculty of Biology and studied there until 1977, when his father, Soviet dissident Valentin Turchin, was exiled from the Soviet Union. In 1980, Turchin obtained B.A. (cum laude) from New York University, and in his Ph.D. in from Duke University in 1985.

Career

Throughout his career Turchin has made contributions to various fields, such as economic history and historical dynamics. He is one of the founders of cliodynamics, the scientific discipline at the intersection of historical macrosociology, cliometrics, and mathematical modeling of social processes. Turchin developed an original theory explaining how large historical empires evolve by the mechanism of multilevel selection. His research on secular cycles has contributed to our understanding of the collapse of complex societies as has his re-interpretation of Ibn Khaldun's notion of asabiyya as "collective solidarity".

One of Turchin's most prominent fields of research is his study of the hypothesis that population pressure causes increased warfare. Turchin, in collaboration with Korotayev, has shown that negative results do not falsify the population-warfare hypothesis. Population and warfare are dynamical variables. If their interaction causes sustained oscillations, then we do not in general expect to find strong correlation between the two variables measured at the same time (that is, unlagged). Turchin and Korotayev have explored mathematically what the dynamical patterns of interaction between population and warfare (focusing on internal warfare) might be in stateless and state societies. Next, they tested the model predictions in several empirical case studies: early modern England, Han and Tang China, and the Roman Empire. Their empirical results have supported the population-warfare theory: Turchin and Korotayev have found that there is a tendency for population numbers and internal warfare intensity to oscillate with the same period but shifted in phase (with warfare peaks following population peaks). Furthermore, they have demonstrated that the rates of change of the two variables behave precisely as predicted by the theory: population rate of change is negatively affected by warfare intensity, while warfare rate of change is positively affected by population density.

In 2010 Turchin published research using 40 combined social indicators to predict that there would be worldwide social unrest in the 2020s. He subsequently cited the success of Donald Trump's 2016 presidential campaign as evidence that "negative trends seem to be accelerating" and that there has been an "unprecedented collapse of social norms governing civilized discourse". In 2020, Turchin and Jack Goldstone predicted that political and civic unrest in the United States would continue regardless of the party in power until a leader took action to reduce inequality and improve the social indicators that are tracked in their research.

Works
Turchin has published over 200 scientific articles (including more than a dozen in Nature, Science, or PNAS) and at least eight books. He is the founder of the journal, Cliodynamics, "...dedicated to 'the search for general principles explaining the functioning and dynamics of historical societies'", and manages a blog, Cliodynamica.

Books

Selected journal articles
 (Article retracted on July 7, 2021)

Turchin P. (2006). Population Dynamics and Internal Warfare: A Reconsideration. Social Evolution & History 5(2): 112–147 (with Andrey Korotayev).

See also
 Elite overproduction
 Structural-demographic theory
 Seshat (project)

References

Further reading
  Article on work by Goldstone and Turchin.
 
  Turchin adopted and expanded Goldstone's model to apply to modern industrial states. They later became collaborators.

External links 
Social Evolution Forum

Maini, Alessandro. "On Historical Dynamics by P. Turchin". Biophysical Economics and Sustainability 5, No. 1 (4 February 2020): 3. DOI: 10.1007/s41247-019-0063-x.

1957 births
Evolutionary biologists
World system scholars
Complex systems scientists
Living people
New York University alumni
Duke University alumni
University of Connecticut faculty
Writers from Moscow
Soviet emigrants to the United States
American biologists